This is a list of notable hotels in Greenland.

Hotels in Greenland

 Hotel Arctic, Ilulissat
 Hotel Hans Egede, Nuuk
 Hotel Kangerlussuaq, Kangerlussuaq
 Hotel Sisimiut, Sisimiut
 Seamen's Home, Nuuk

See also
 List of companies of Greenland
 Lists of hotels – an index of hotel list articles on Wikipedia

References

External links
 

 
Greenland
Hotels